This article lists the Canadian number-one albums of 1975. The chart was compiled and published by RPM every Saturday.

The top position (December 28, 1974, Vol. 22, No. 19) preceding January 11, 1975 (Vol. 24, No. 15) was Jim Croce's Photographs & Memories. Elton John's Captain Fantastic and the Brown Dirt Cowboy entered the chart at #1. Elton John held the top position in the albums and singles charts simultaneously on January 11 – February 1.

(Entries with dates marked thus* are not presently on record at Library and Archives Canada and were inferred from the following week's listing. The issue that should have been published on October 11 is dated October 13. There were no publications from November 8 through December 6.  The November 1 chart, Vol. 24, No. 9, is followed by December 13's chart, Vol. 24, No. 10-11-12. No "last week" positions were specified on this issue's chart, indicating that the charting process was restarted.)

References

See also
1975 in music
RPM number-one hits of 1975

1975
1975 in Canadian music